Time to Leave is a 2005 French drama film written and directed by François Ozon. It was screened in the Un Certain Regard section of the 2005 Cannes Film Festival.

Plot
Romain, a gay 31-year-old fashion photographer, discovers he is terminally ill and has only three months to live. He rejects the treatment for his metastasized tumor that might offer him a slim (less than 5%) chance of survival.

Romain exhibits both selfish and reckless behavior. He realizes that his good looks give him a certain amount of leeway and he tests the forbearance of the people who care for him. He chases away his lover Sasha and delights in antagonizing his sister. The only person in whom he confides about his illness is his grandmother Laura.

Cast
 Melvil Poupaud as Romain
 Jeanne Moreau as Laura
 Valeria Bruni Tedeschi as Jany
 Daniel Duval as the father
 Marie Rivière as the mother
 Christian Sengewald as Sasha
 Louise-Anne Hippeau as Sophie

Awards
2005 Valladolid International Film Festival:
 Silver Spike – François Ozon
 Best Actor – Melvil Poupaud

Critical reception
The film received generally positive reviews from critics. On the review aggregator website Rotten Tomatoes, the film holds an approval rating of 75% based on 55 reviews, with an average rating of 6.6/10. The website's critics consensus reads, "A reflective look at our own mortality through the experience of a middle-aged French man, Time To Leave manages to pull at our heart strings without resorting to cliches, and leaves a lasting impression." On Metacritic, the film has an average score of 67 out of 100 based on 21 reviews.

Moira MacDonald of The Seattle Times wrote, "It's a quiet and poignant look at a life as it slips away, seen through the eyes of a character who's not always likable but remains entirely real".

References

External links
 
 
 
 A.O. Scott's review in The New York Times
 An interview with Ozon about the film 

2005 drama films
2005 LGBT-related films
2000s French films
2000s French-language films
Films directed by François Ozon
France 2 Cinéma films
French drama films
French LGBT-related films
Gay-related films
LGBT-related drama films
StudioCanal films